Governor Rosselló may refer to:
Pedro Rosselló (born 1944), Governor of Puerto Rico from 1993 to 2001
Ricardo Rosselló (born 1979), Governor of Puerto Rico from 2017 to 2019; son of Pedro